Abid Sadykovich Sadykov (Uzbek: Obid Sodyqovich Sodyqov; Russian: Абид Садыкович Садыков; 15 November 1913 – 21 July 1987) was a Soviet Uzbek organic chemist, academician, and politician.

Early life and education 
Abid Sadykov was born in Tashkent, Russian Turkestan, Russian Empire on November 15, 1913. He graduated from the Central Asian University of Tashkent in 1937 with a Doktor nauk (Doctor of Sciences).

Career 
After graduating, he taught at the Tashkent Institute of Textile and Light Industry from 1937 to 1939. From 1941, he worked at the Central Asian University of Tashkent and became a Rector at the university in 1958. He simultaneously worked as the Director of the Institute of Chemistry of the Academy of Sciences of the Uzbek SSR. From 1963 to 1967, he served as the Chairman of the Supreme Soviet of the Uzbek SSR. From 1966 to 1984, Sadykov served as the President of the Academy of Sciences of the Uzbek SSR. He became a full member of the Academy of Sciences of the Soviet Union on November 28, 1972. In 1973, Sadykov became the Head of the Department of Bio organic Chemistry of the Academy of Sciences of the Uzbek SSR. He was awarded the Hero of Socialist Labour in 1973.

Sadykov was a member of the 9th Convocation of the Supreme Soviet of the Soviet Union.

Death 
Sadykov passed away in Tashkent, Uzbek SSR, Soviet Union on July 21, 1987. He was buried at the Chigatai Cemetery.

Awards 

 Hero of Socialist Labour (1973)
 Order of Outstanding Merit (2002, posthumous)
 Order of Lenin (five times)
 Order of the October Revolution
 Order of the Red Banner of Labour
 Order of Friendship of Peoples
 Order of the Badge of Honour
 Biruni State Prize

See also 

 National University of Uzbekistan
 Hero of Socialist Labour

References 

1913 births
1987 deaths
Academic staff of National University of Uzbekistan
People from Syr-Darya Oblast
Recipients of the Order of Lenin
Recipients of the Order of Friendship of Peoples
Heroes of Socialist Labour
Scientists from Tashkent
Soviet chemists
Soviet politicians
Communist Party of the Soviet Union members
Uzbek Soviet Socialist Republic people
Full Members of the USSR Academy of Sciences
National University of Uzbekistan alumni